"Something's Missing" is the third single from Australian indie pop band Sheppard's debut album Bombs Away. It is the follow up to their 5× platinum selling, number-one single, "Geronimo". The single was announced on 23 June 2014 in conjunction with the album and tour details. "Something's Missing" was available to download on iTunes on 27 June 2014.

Promotion
An acoustic version of "Something's Missing" was published on Sheppard's YouTube account on 18 February 2013. On 14 July 2014, Sheppard performed "Something's Missing" on the Today show.

Track listing
Digital download
"Something's Missing" – 2:51

Reviews
A reviewer at The Music said; "The track shows a slightly softer, more subdued side to the cheery, poptastic vibe of their previous singles, but their trademark, uplifting style is still present". A reviewer at VMusic said of the song, simply; "stunning".

Charts
"Something's Missing" debuted at number 35 on the Australian Singles Chart for the week commencing 7 July 2014.

Release history

References

2014 singles
2014 songs
Sheppard (band) songs